Parliamentary elections were held in Kiribati on 23 September 1998, with a second round on 30 September. Although all candidates for the 40 seats ran as independents, they could be divided into three groups; the National Progressive Party, Protect the Maneaba, and unaffiliated independents. Independents emerged as the largest group in Parliament, with 15 of the 40 seats.

Results

References

Kiribati
1998 in Kiribati
Elections in Kiribati
Election and referendum articles with incomplete results